The 2012–13 Swiss Super League, also known as Raiffeisen Super League for sponsoring purposes, was the 116th season of top-tier football in Switzerland. It began on 14 July 2012 and ended on 2 June 2013. Basel successfully defended their title.

The league comprised the best eight sides from the 2011–12 season, the 2011–12 Swiss Challenge League champions FC St. Gallen, and FC Sion, the winners of the relegation/promotion play-off between the ninth-placed Super League team and the Challenge League runners-up.

Since Switzerland climbed from sixteenth to fourteenth place in the UEFA association coefficient rankings at the end of the 2011–12 season, the league regained its second spot for the UEFA Champions League. In other changes, the league abolished the relegation/promotion play-off from this season after a structural change at lower tiers of the Swiss football league pyramid.

Teams
No team were relegated on competitive grounds at the end of the 2011–12 season after Neuchâtel Xamax were expelled from the league over financial irregularities midway through the campaign. The club went into administration soon afterwards and was eventually liquidated. Its successors Neuchâtel Xamax 1912 were subsequently inserted into the fifth-tier 2. Liga Interregional. Xamax were replaced by 2011–12 Challenge League champions FC St. Gallen, who immediately returned to the highest football league of Switzerland.

A further spot in the league was contested in a relegation/promotion playoff between ninth-placed FC Sion and Challenge League runners-up FC Aarau. Both teams played a two-legged series, which was won by Sion, 3–1 on aggregate. The club from Valais thus remained in the league despite having received a 36-point deduction for fielding ineligible players during the season.

Stadia and locations

Personnel and kits

League table

Results

First and Second Round

Third and Fourth Round

Season statistics

Top scorers

References

External links
 
 

 

Swiss Super League seasons
Swiss
1